The Blue Lightning is a 1986 Australian film directed by Lee Philips and starring Sam Elliott, Rebecca Gilling, John Meillon, Robert Coleby, Max Phipps, and Robert Culp.

Premise
Easygoing San Francisco private detective Harry Wingate (Sam Elliott) gets a six-figure offer from millionaire Brutus Cathcart (Max Phipps) to travel to Australia and retrieve Cathcart's prized opal from former Irish Republican Army terrorist sharpshooter Lester McInally (Robert Culp). With the help of an Aborigine rancher (Jack Davis) and revenge-minded widow Kate McQueen (Rebecca Gilling), Wingate battles McInally and his minions, who have taken over an entire outback town.

Cast
Sam Elliott as Harry Wingate
Robert Culp as Lester McInally
Jack Davis as Jahrgadu 
Peter Ford as Quentin McQueen

References

External links
The Blue Lightning at IMDb
The Blue Lightning at Oz Movies

Australian action drama films
1980s English-language films
1986 films
1986 action films
Films directed by Lee Philips
1980s Australian films